Bhasha Mukherjee (born 5 November 1995) is an Indian doctor, model and beauty pageant titleholder who was crowned Miss England 2019 and represented England at the Miss World 2019 pageant.

References

External links
 

1996 births
Living people
Bengali female models
English beauty pageant winners
Indian emigrants to England
21st-century British medical doctors
Miss World 2019 delegates